Nicola Pavarini (born 24 February 1974 in Brescia) is a retired Italian footballer, who last played as a goalkeeper for Parma F.C. in Serie A.

Career
Pavarini started his career at Brescia. After he made his first team debut in the 1996–97 Serie B season, he was loaned to Serie C1 clubs Gualdo and Cesena.

In summer 2001, he left for Acireale of Serie C2, where his started to play regularly in the second season. in summer 2003 he moved back to Serie B for Livorno, replacing Marco Amelia who left Livorno on loan.

Pavarini was signed for Reggina in summer 2004, along with new signing Salvatore Soviero to compete the first choice. In 2005–06 season, he became new signing Ivan Pelizzoli backup. But due to his injury, he managed to play 18 Serie A games.

In June 2006, he was signed by another Seire A club Siena, replacing Antonio Mirante and Marco Fortin. But he played as Austrian international Alexander Manninger's backup. In January 2007, he was exchanged with Francesco Benussi of U.S. Lecce, joining the Serie B team on loan.

In August 2007, he joined Parma and became first choice after the 2008 departure of Luca Bucci. He won promotion back to Serie A in the 2008–09, but lost his place in the team to new signing Antonio Mirante in the summer of 2009 and made just five league appearances in the following two seasons. After injuries to Mirante in 2011–12, Pavarini made 10 league appearances.

On 15 May 2014, Pavarini announced his retirement at the end of the season after seven years at Parma.

Honours
Brescia
Serie B Champions and Promotion: 1996–97

Livorno
Serie B Third Place and Promotion: 2003–04

Parma
Serie B Second Place and Promotion: 2008–09

External links
Gazzetta dello Sports player profile

References

1974 births
Living people
Italian footballers
Association football goalkeepers
Reggina 1914 players
A.S. Gualdo Casacastalda players
U.S. Livorno 1915 players
Brescia Calcio players
A.C.N. Siena 1904 players
U.S. Lecce players
Parma Calcio 1913 players
Serie A players
Serie B players
Sportspeople from the Province of Brescia
A.C. Cesena players
Footballers from Lombardy